Charles McClure (1804 – January 10, 1846) was a Democratic member of the U.S. House of Representatives from Pennsylvania.

Charles McClure was born on Willow Grove farm, near Carlisle, Pennsylvania. He graduated from Dickinson College in Carlisle in 1824. He studied law, was admitted to the bar in 1826 and practiced. He was a member of the Pennsylvania House of Representatives in 1835.

McClure was elected as a Democrat to the Twenty-fifth Congress. He was elected to the Twenty-sixth Congress to fill the vacancy caused by the death of William S. Ramsey.  He served as secretary of state of Pennsylvania from 1843 to 1845, and was active in promoting the public-school system of Pennsylvania. He died in Allegheny, Pennsylvania, in 1846, and is interred in Allegheny Cemetery in Pittsburgh, Pennsylvania.

Sources

The Political Graveyard

External links

1804 births
1846 deaths
Democratic Party members of the Pennsylvania House of Representatives
Pennsylvania lawyers
People from Cumberland County, Pennsylvania
Democratic Party members of the United States House of Representatives from Pennsylvania
Burials at Allegheny Cemetery
19th-century American politicians
19th-century American lawyers